"Forty Miles of Bad Road" is a rock and roll instrumental recorded by Duane Eddy. Released as a single in 1959, it also appeared on Eddy's 1960 album $1,000,000 Worth of Twang.

Background
Duane told Oldies Radio DJ "Wild" Wayne that the title came about when he and his producer Lee Hazlewood were waiting in line to buy tickets at a movie theatre. They overheard two guys in front of them discussing a blind date that one of them just had. One asked the other as to how the blind date went. His friend replied that it was ok but the girl had a face that looked like "forty miles of bad road". Duane and Lee looked at each other and said we have the title of our next record.

Chart performance
The song charted at #9 on the Pop chart. "Forty Miles of Bad Road" also went to #17 on the Hot R&B Sides chart.

Song influence
The idiom is referenced in the lyrics of the R.E.M. song "Crush with Eyeliner": "She's a sad tomato/She's three miles of bad road". 
It is also referenced in Bob Dylan's 2000 Academy Award winning song "Things Have Changed": "I've been walking forty miles of bad road/If the bible is right, the world will explode."

References

Duane Eddy songs
Songs written by Duane Eddy
Songs written by Al Casey (rock & roll guitarist)
1959 singles
1950s instrumentals
1959 songs
Jamie Records singles